Imperator Romanorum or emperor of the Romans is a title first held by Augustus. Augustus had (for all purposes) abolished the roman republic and became its "king". The title of king, though, (rex romae) had a negative connotation. The romans did everything to keep the king away from power, and until the official adoption of Christianity, the king only had a minor religious role. This is why Octavian (Augustus original name) took the title of emperor, referring to the nickname of Julius Caesar, his adoptive father.

Until the reign of the byzantine queen Irene of Athens, the title of Imperator Romanorum had been given to the monarch of Byzantium by the pope in exchange for protection.  But because Irene was a woman, and that Charlemagne now protected the papal states, Pope Leo III crowned Charlemagne Holy Roman Emperor. This Title continued to exist until 1806, when Napoleon made Emperor Francis II abdicate.

Currently, there are no Imperator Romanorum, the crown of the emperor is kept in Vienna, as it served for the title of Austrian Emperor. The crown is the last crown of the Imperator Romanorum, and the emperor not always had a crown, some of the Roman Emperors had a corona civica to show their links to the military, and humbleness.

Titles with conotations 
Imperator Romanorum ("Emperor of the Romans") may refer to the title of:
 Holy Roman Emperor (first held by Charlemagne)
 Roman Emperor (historically Imperator Romanus).
 Byzantine emperor

References

Ancient Roman titles